Jean-Marie Elie (born 30 September 1950) is a French professional football manager and former player who played as a midfielder. As of the 2021–22 season, he is the head coach of Championnat National 3 club Cherbourg. During his playing career of fourteen years, he played for Lens and Saint-Étienne, notably winning the Division 1 in the 1980–81 season with the latter.

International career 
Elie made one appearance for the France B national team in a 1–1 friendly draw to Cercle Brugge on 20 November 1973.

Post-playing career 
Elie retired from football in 1981. From 1983 to 1984, he worked as the sporting director of his former club Saint-Étienne. He would then go on to be the manager of UST Equeurdreville from 1984 to 2007, a managerial reign of twenty-three years. Later, he started working as a sport educator and coach for the Lecanu futsal team. In September 2009, he received the Trophée Georges-Boulogne, a trophy awarded by the Amicale des éducateurs de football.

From 2017 to 2019, Elie worked as a member of staff at Cherbourg. In January 2019, he took over the club's head coach position.

Honours 
Lens

 Division 2: 1972–73
 Coupe de France runner-up: 1974–75

Saint-Étienne

 Division 1: 1980–81
 Coupe de France runner-up: 1980–81

Notes

References 

1950 births
Living people
Sportspeople from Aube
French footballers
Association football midfielders
RC Lens players
AS Saint-Étienne players
Ligue 1 players
Ligue 2 players
Championnat de France Amateur (1935–1971) players
France B international footballers
French football managers
AS Saint-Étienne non-playing staff
AS Cherbourg Football managers
Championnat National 3 managers
Footballers from Grand Est